Gymnacranthera is a genus of flowering plants in the family Myristicaceae found from Peninsular Malaysia and Sumatra to New Guinea and the Philippines.

Species

Species include:

Gymnacranthera bancana (Miq.) J.Sinclair
Gymnacranthera canarica (King) Warb.
Gymnacranthera contracta Warb.
Gymnacranthera crassinervia Warb.
Gymnacranthera cryptocaryoides Elmer
Gymnacranthera farquhariana (Hook.f. & Thomson) Warb.
Gymnacranthera farquhariana var. eugeniifolia (A.DC.) R.T.A. Schouten
Gymnacranthera farquhariana var. paniculata (A.DC.) R.T.A.Schouten
Gymnacranthera farquhariana var. zippeliana (Miq.) R.T.A.Schouten
Gymnacranthera forbesii (King) Warb.
Gymnacranthera forbesii var. crassinervis (Warb.) J.Sinclair
Gymnacranthera maliliensis R.T.A.Schouten
Gymnacranthera negrosensis Elmer
Gymnacranthera ocellata R.T.A.Schouten
Gymnacranthera urdanetensis Elmer

References

Myristicaceae
Myristicaceae genera
Taxonomy articles created by Polbot